The 202nd Coastal Division was an infantry division of the Royal Italian Army during World War II. Royal Italian Army coastal divisions were second line divisions formed with reservists and equipped with second rate materiel. Recruited locally, they were often commanded by officers called out of retirement.

History 
The division was activated on 15 November 1941 in Palermo by reorganizing the II Coastal Sector Command. The division was assigned to XII Army Corps, which was responsible for the defense of the western half of the island of Sicily. In January 1942 the division moved its headquarter to Castelvetrano. The division was responsible for the coastal defense of the coast between Marsala and Sciacca. On 10 June 1943 the 202nd Coastal Division ceded some of its units to the newly formed 230th Coastal Division, which took over responsibility for the coast between Marsala and Mazara del Vallo, leaving the 202nd with the responsibility for the coast between Mazara del Vallo and Sciacca.

The 202nd Coastal Division fought against units of the American Seventh Army after the allies landed on Sicily on 10 July 1943. By 24 July 1943 the division had been severely decimated and was therefore officially declared lost due to wartime events.'

Organization 
 202nd Coastal Division
 124th Coastal Regiment
 CCCLXXVI Coastal Battalion
 CCCLXXXVI Coastal Battalion
 DXLIII Coastal Battalion
 142nd Coastal Regiment
 CCCLXXVII Coastal Battalion
 CDXVIII Coastal Battalion
 CDXXVII Coastal Battalion
 CDLXVI Coastal Battalion
 CDXC Coastal Battalion
 62nd Coastal Artillery Regiment
 LVI Coastal Artillery Group (149/35 heavy guns)
 LXXXVIII Coastal Artillery Group (149/35 heavy guns)
 CXVIII Coastal Artillery Group (105/28 howitzers)
 CLXXII Coastal Artillery Group (105/28 howitzers)
 63rd Coastal Artillery Regiment
 LV Coastal Artillery Group (105/32 field guns)
 CXLI Coastal Artillery Group (75/27 field guns)
 CXLIII Coastal Artillery Group (149/35 howitzers))
 CLVII Coastal Artillery Group (149/19 howitzers)
 CIX Machine Gun Battalion
 509th Machine Gun Company
 637th Machine Gun Company
 638th Machine Gun Company
 645th Machine Gun Company
 120th Mixed Engineer Platoon
 124th Mixed Engineer Platoon
 202nd Carabinieri Section
 161st Field Post Office
 Division Services

Attached to the division:
 Armored Train 76/3/T, in Mazara del Vallo (4x 76/40 Mod. 1916 naval guns, 4x 20/77 anti-aircraft guns)

Commanding officers 
The division's commanding officers were:

 Generale di Brigata Mario Badino Rossi (15 November 1941 - 4 September 1942)
 Generale di Divisione Luigi Sibille (5 September 1942 - 31 March 1943)
 Generale di Brigata Gino Ficalbi (1 April 1943 - 24 July 1943)

References 

 
 

Infantry divisions of Italy in World War II
Coastal divisions of Italy